Violaxanthin is a xanthophyll pigment with an orange color found in a variety of plants. Violaxanthin is the product of the  epoxidation of zeaxanthin where the oxygen atoms are from reactive oxygen species (ROS).  Such ROS's arise when a plant is subject to solar radiation so intense that the light cannot all be absorbed by the chlorophyl.

Food coloring

Violaxanthin is used as a food coloring under the E number E161e and INS number 161e. The coloring is not approved for use in food in the EU or the United States, but is allowed in Australia and New Zealand.

Additional reading

References

Carotenoids
Epoxides
Food colorings
Tetraterpenes